The Evolution Tour was a concert tour by the American rock band Journey. The tour was in support of their 1979 album Evolution which peaked at #20 on the Billboard 200 like the previous album Infinity.

Background
From this tour, the band would further commit themselves to more touring, they would perform shows in Japan after having made a considerable dent in the music scene there. Following that was a lengthy tour in the United States, with ticket and album sales at their highest ever. The tour also included the show at the 1979 World Series of Rock on July 28, 1979 in Cleveland, Ohio, where they would perform with headliners Aerosmith, Ted Nugent, Thin Lizzy, AC/DC and Scorpions. The show was notable for the violence with the rowdy audience, as well as the death of one person before the show started.

At the August 5 show in Chicago's Day in the Park festival, security was much tighter for the band as they performed alongside Santana. The festivities were peaceful, nearly 200 people were arrested for a variety of minor infractions.

At the conclusion of the tour on September 2, 1979, the band would take a bit of a rest before beginning work on their next album Departure. Despite the album and ticket sales they have made, the band were more received by British critics than the American critics. The band had expanded its operation to include a lighting and trucking operation for their future performances as the tour had grossed more than $5 million, making the band as popular as it had ever been in five years.

Reception 
John Quayle, who attended the Pittsburgh performance, stated in a review for the Observer-Reporter: "Primed by a hot Graham Parker and The Rumour, a near capacity crowd greeted Journey with open arms at the Stanley Theater and Journey responded very well, giving Pittsburgh a night of driving rock, sweetsung harmonies and a truly unforgettable performance." He concluded his review by stating that it was a 'fine concert', praising the setlist and noting on the approval of the audience.

Setlist 

Songs played overall
"Majestic"
"La Do Da"
"Somethin' to Hide"
"Next"
"Feeling That Way"
"Anytime"
"Lights"
"Lady Luck"
"Can Do"
"Too Late"
"Kohoutek"
"Topaz"
"Winds of March"
"Karma"
"Lovin', Touchin' Squeezin'"
"City of the Angels"
"Do You Recall"
"Daydream"
"Of a Lifetime"
"When You're Alone (It Ain't Easy)"
"Just the Same Way"
"Lovin' You is Easy"
"Moon Theme"
"On a Saturday Night"
"Wheel in the Sky"
"She Makes Me Feel Alright"
Encore
"Patiently"
"Opened the Door"
"Precious Time"

Typical setlist
"Majestic"
"La Do Da"
"Next"
"Feeling That Way"
"Anytime"
"Lights"
"Too Late"
"Kohoutek"
"Winds of March"
"Lovin', Touchin' Squeezin'"
"Do You Recall"
"Just the Same Way"
"Lovin' You is Easy"
"Wheel in the Sky"
Encore
"Patiently"
"Opened the Door"

Tour dates

Box office score data

Personnel
 Steve Perry – lead vocals, keyboards
 Neal Schon – guitars, backing vocals
 Gregg Rolie – keyboards, backing vocals
 Ross Valory – bass, backing vocals
 Steve Smith – drums, percussion

References

Sources

Journey (band) concert tours
1979 concert tours